Tudigong or Tudishen, also known simply as Tudi is a tutelary (i.e. guardian or patron) deity of a locality and the human communities who inhabit it in Chinese folk religion and Taoism.

Names
Other names of the god include:
 Tugong ( "Lord of the Soil");
 Tudiye ( "Soil-Ground Father");
 Dabogong ( "Great Elder Lord") or Bogong ( "Elder Lord");
 Sheshen ( "God of the Soil") or Shegong ( "Lord of the Soil");
 Tudijun ( "Ruler God of the Soil").

Extended titles of the god include:
 Tudihuofushen ( "God who May Bless the Soil");
 Fudezhengshen ( "Right God of Blessing and Virtue") or Fudegong ( "Lord of Blessing and Virtue").

Commoners often call Tudigong "grandfather" (yeye), which reflects his close relationship with the common people.

Variants

Tudipo
In the countryside, he is sometimes given a wife, Tǔdìpó ( "Grandmother of the Soil and the Ground"), placed next to him on the altar. She may be seen as a just and benevolent Deity on the same rank as her husband, or as a grudging old woman holding back her husband's benedictions, which explains why one does not always receive fair retribution for good behavior.

Another story says that Tudipo is supposed to be a young lady. After Tudigong received a heavenly rank, he gave everything that the people asked for. When one of the Deities went down to Earth to do inspections, he saw that Tudigong was distributing blessings unnecessarily. Soon after that, the Deity went to the Celestial Palace and reported to the Jade Emperor.

After the Jade Emperor knew this, he found out that there was a lady that was going to be killed, but she was not guilty. Thus, the Jade Emperor told a Deity to go down to Earth and bring the lady to heaven. When the lady was brought to the Celestial Palace, the Jade Emperor bestowed her to Tudigong as his wife. She was ordered to look after how many blessings Tudigong distributes and that they not be unnecessarily distributed. This is why many people do not want to pay respect to Tudipo, because they are afraid that she will not let Tudigong give much wealth to them.

Dizhushen
The Landlord God is a deity worshipped in Chinese folk beliefs who is analogous but is not to be confused with Tudigong. 

The tablet for the Landlord God is typically inscribed with two rows:

On the left: (in Singapore and Malaysia) “The Landlord Wealth God of the Overseas Tang People” or (in Hong Kong and Chinese diaspora elsewhere) “The Landlord Wealth God from Front to Back”

On the right: The Dragon God of the Five Directions and Five Lands (fengshui). 

The names are accompanied by a side couplet of various wordings that praise the virtues of the Landlord God. It is believed that the Landlord God has powers to help gather wealth, and the position of the tablet must be placed properly according to the laws of fengshui.

Village Gods
The Village God has developed from land worship. Before Chenghuangshen ("City God") became more prominent in China, land worship had a hierarchy of deities conforming strictly to social structure, in which the emperor, kings, dukes, officials and common people were allowed to worship only the land gods within their command; the highest land deity was the Houtu ("Queen of the Earth").

Ranked beneath City Gods, the Village Gods have been very popular among villagers as the grassroot deities since the 14th century during the Ming dynasty. Some scholars speculate that this change came because of an imperial edict, because it is reported that the Hongwu Emperor of the Ming dynasty was born in a Village God shrine. The image of the Village God is that of a simply clothed, smiling, white-bearded man. His wife, the Grandmother of the Village, looks like a normal old lady.

Ông Địa and Thần Tài
Vietnam and Cambodia also observe the tradition of enshrining the Earth God at home and in businesses, with the addition of the images of Ông Địa (the earth god who bears a similar appearance to Budai (Hotei), or Maitreya of Buddhism as adaptation), and Thần Tài (the wealth god who is in fact Caishen). In Vietnam, Ông Địa takes the role of the earth god in a similar fashion to both Tudigong and Dizhushen, with Thần Tài serving as his partner or assistant.

Festivals
In Taiwan, festivals dedicated to Tudigong typically take place on the second day of the second month and the 15th day of the eighth month on the Chinese lunar calendar.

Gallery

See also
 Tian Di (天地)
 Hou Tu (後土)
 She Ji (社稷)
 Men Shen (門神)
 Zao Jun (灶君)
 Tua Pek Kong (大伯公)
 Chinese folk religion
 Agriculture in Chinese mythology
 Chinese mythology
 Spirit tablet
 Fengshui
 Religion in China
Nisse (folklore)

References

Chinese gods
Fortune gods
Earth gods
Tutelary deities
Journey to the West characters